Thann (Alsatian: Dànn) is a commune in the northeastern French department of Haut-Rhin, in Grand Est. It is the sous-préfecture of the arrondissement of Thann-Guebwiller and part of the canton of Cernay. Its inhabitants are known as Thannois.

Geography
Thann is situated at the foot of the Vosges mountains, where the valley of the river Thur enters the Upper Rhine Plain. The Thur runs through the middle of the town.

History
In 1635, during the Thirty Years' War, Thann was taken by imperialist forces. A mercenary among those troops described it as a "beautiful city, which lies on a mountain and is strongly fortified."

Demographic evolution

Transport
Thann is 43 km from Colmar and 21 km from Mulhouse. The town is also well situated for the French autoroute network such as the A35 and A36.

The RN66 (Route Nationale 66) passes through Thann, providing an east-west route between Mulhouse and Épinal.

 Thann and the Thur valley are served by regular TER trains on a branch line running from Mulhouse to Kruth.
 A new tram-train service of the Mulhouse tramway links Thann to the city centre of Mulhouse.

Architectural heritage
Despite sustaining heavy damage in World War I and World War II, Thann contains several old buildings and monuments of significance.

La Collégiale Saint-Thiébaut

Situated in the centre of the old town, the church known as the Collégiale is good example of the style of Gothic architecture that flourished in the Rhine valley in the late Middle Ages. The Cathedrals of Strasbourg and Freiburg in Germany are also built in a similar style.

The building owes its name "La collégiale" to the college of monks who moved to Thann from the nearby town of Saint-Amarin in 1442. Construction of the collégiale took more than 200 years, from the end of the 13th Century through the 15th Century, and was completed in 1516 with the 78m tall spire.

For an extensive study of the Thann collegiate church, circumstances of its erection, issues of patronage, and unique sculptural programs, see Assaf Pinkus, Workshops and Patrons of St. Theobald in Thann (Waxmann Verlag: Muenster, Berlin, New York, 2006).

La Tour des Sorcières (The Witches' Tower)
This was a tower in the old town walls, and built in 1411. The bulbous roof dates from 1628. Today the interior houses a museum dedicated to winemaking.

Le Château de l'Engelbourg (Engelbourg Castle)

The ruins of the Engelbourg Castle sit on a hill to the north of the old town.  The castle was constructed in the 13th century by the Counts of Ferrette to control the entrance to the valley and ensure the paying of tolls by those wishing to cross the Vosges by way of the Thur valley and the col de Bussang. The castle was destroyed on the orders of Louis XIV.  During demolition, one of towers overturned and cracked into sections, one of which forms a large stone ring known locally today as The Witch's Eye (L'œil de la sorcière).

Education
The town is served by 4 écoles maternelles; 3 écoles élémentaires; 2 collèges (Collège Charles Walch and Collège Rémy Faesch); and 2 lycées (Lycée Professionel Charles Pointet and   Lycée Scheurer-Kestner).

Tourism
 Thann is the southern terminus of the route des Vins d'Alsace. The northern side of the town is overlooked by the Rangen vineyard, one of the few vineyards in Alsace to be classed grand cru.

People
 Ernst Robert Curtius, literary critic
 Emmanuel Fernandes, politician
 Jean-Baptiste-Joseph Gobel

Twin towns
  - Gubbio, Italy
  - Tonneins, France

See also
 Communes of the Haut-Rhin department

References

External links

 Official site of Thann town council (in French)
 Tourist Office of the Pays de Thann (in French)

Communes of Haut-Rhin
Subprefectures in France